A bateleur is a medium-sized eagle.

Bateleur may also refer to:
 Bateleur Aquilla, ultralight trike aircraft
 Bateleur Sky Sports, a US aircraft distributor active in the late 1990s and early 2000s
 Bateleur Windlass, ultralight trike aircraft
 Denel Aerospace Systems Bateleur, an unmanned aerial vehicle
 RMT Bateleur, a German light-sport aircraft
 Bateleur FV2 An improved version of the Valkiri, a multiple rocket launcher